Q59 may refer to:
 Q59 (New York City bus)
 Al-Hashr, a surah of the Quran